Seizure is a 1974 horror film. It is the directorial debut of Oliver Stone, who also co-wrote the screenplay.

Plot 

Horror writer Edmund Blackstone (Jonathan Frid) sees his recurring nightmare come to chilling life one weekend as one by one, his friends and family are killed by three villains: the Queen of Evil (Martine Beswick), a dwarf named Spider (Hervé Villechaize), and a giant scar-faced strongman called Jackal (Henry Judd Baker).

Cast 

 Jonathan Frid as Edmund Blackstone
 Martine Beswick as Queen of Evil
 Joseph Sirola as Charlie
 Hervé Villechaize as Spider
 Christina Pickles as Nicole Blackstone
 Troy Donahue as Mark Frost
 Mary Woronov as Mikki Hughes
 Richard Cox as Gerald
 Henry Judd Baker as Jackal
 Alexis Kirk as Arris

Production 

Seizure is the directorial debut of Oliver Stone, who also co-wrote the screenplay. Star Mary Woronov would later claim that one of the film's producers was gangster Michael Thevis, who partially bankrolled the film in an attempt to launder money, as he was under investigation by the FBI.

Release 

The film had a very limited release theatrically in the United States by Cinerama Releasing Corporation, playing on New York's 42nd street in 1974.

The film was released on VHS by various video companies in the 1980s including Prism Entertainment. A transfer to DVD and Blu-ray was released on September 9, 2014 by Scorpion Releasing.

See also 

 List of American films of 1974

References

External links 

 
 

1974 films
1974 horror films
1970s psychological thriller films
American satirical films
Canadian satirical films
American supernatural horror films
Canadian supernatural horror films
English-language Canadian films
Films directed by Oliver Stone
Films with screenplays by Oliver Stone
Films about writers
1974 directorial debut films
1970s English-language films
1970s American films
1970s Canadian films